Linton Township High School and Community Building or Pimento School is a historic school and community centre building located at Pimento in Linton Township, Vigo County, Indiana.  It was built by architects from the Albert G. Beldon company in 1925. It is in the American Craftsman style of architecture. Contractor was James O. Sickels of Princeton, Indiana. The building is now abandoned in disrepair.

The school was placed on the National Register of Historic Places in 2002.

References

School buildings on the National Register of Historic Places in Indiana
1925 establishments in Indiana
School buildings completed in 1925
Buildings and structures in Vigo County, Indiana
National Register of Historic Places in Vigo County, Indiana